Kryuchkovo was an air base in Tver Oblast, Russia, located 34 km northwest of Tver. It is shown on a 1973 Department of Defense Global Navigation Chart No. 1 and was probably a 1950s-era Cold War airfield.  Very little remains and its exact location is uncertain.

Soviet Air Force bases